Alan Schaaf (born October 21, 1987) is an American entrepreneur. He is best known as the founder and CEO of the image sharing app and website Imgur.

Early life 
Schaaf was born in Granville, Ohio. He attended Ohio University and received a bachelor's degree in computer science.

Career 
Schaaf founded Imgur when he was an undergraduate at Ohio University in 2009. Imgur started as a simple image-sharing website and evolved into the largest image-sharing community in the world with more than 150 million monthly active users in 2015. Under Schaaf's leadership, Imgur was bootstrapped and profitable for five years, scaling organically to millions of users before receiving $40 million in investment from Andreessen Horowitz in 2014.

In 2015 Schaaf was listed as one of Forbes' 30 Under 30.

References

External links

American Internet company founders
Living people
Ohio University alumni
1987 births
People from Granville, Ohio
21st-century American businesspeople